"Hello, sailor" is a catchphrase alluding to the sexual frustration of seamen. It may refer to:

Hello Sailor (band), a New Zealand rock band
Hello Sailor (Hello Sailor album)
Hello Sailor (The Blackout Pact album)
Hello Sailor (book), a children's book by Ingrid Godon and Andre Sollie
Hello Sailor (novel), a 1975 book by Eric Idle